is a public university in Sōja, Okayama, Japan, established in 1993.

Faculties and graduate schools

Faculties
Faculty of Health and Welfare Science
Faculty of Computer Science and Systems Engineering
Faculty of Design

Graduate Schools
Graduate School of Health and Welfare Science
Graduate School of Systems Engineering
Graduate School of Design

Campus
 Sōja Campus - (111　Kuboki, Sōja)

See also
List of universities in Japan

External links
  

Educational institutions established in 1993
Public universities in Japan
Universities and colleges in Okayama Prefecture
1993 establishments in Japan